Vitaliy Yuriyovych Kobzar (born 9 May 1972) is a former Kyrgyzstani and Ukrainian footballer. He was a member of the Kyrgyzstan national football team.

External links
Player profile – ffu.org.ua
Player profile – klisf.info

1972 births
Living people
Sportspeople from Bishkek
Kyrgyzstani emigrants to Ukraine
Naturalized citizens of Ukraine
Kyrgyzstani footballers
Kyrgyzstan international footballers
Kyrgyzstani expatriate footballers
Expatriate footballers in Ukraine
FC Alga Bishkek players
FC Dnipro Cherkasy players
FC Obolon-Brovar Kyiv players
FC Vorskla Poltava players
FC Krystal Chortkiv players
Ukrainian Premier League players
Kyrgyzstani people of Ukrainian descent
FC Hirnyk Kryvyi Rih players
Ukrainian football managers
FC Khodak Cherkasy
FC Cherkashchyna managers
Association football forwards